Rail sabotage (colloquially known as wrecking) is the act of disrupting a rail transport network. This includes both acts designed only to hinder or delay as well as acts designed to actually destroy a train.

Sabotage must be distinguished from more blatant methods of disruption (e.g., blowing up a train, train robbery).

Methods

Relay cabinet arson
In 2022, setting fire to rail relay cabinets that control track operations was a common method of sabotage during the 2022 Russian invasion of Ukraine.

Track obstruction

Damage to infrastructure
Notable instances
 1861: East Tennessee bridge burnings – Union sympathizers destroyed nine railroad bridges in East Tennessee, on the orders of President Lincoln. The bridges were quickly rebuilt.
 1864: John Yates Beall, a Confederate Navy officer, was discovered plotting to derail a Union passenger train and executed the following year.
 1905: 20th Century Limited derailment - Although unconfirmed, the evidence pointed heavily to malicious involvement in the derailment of the New York Central Railroad's crack passenger train, the 20th Century Limited, resulting in 21 deaths.
 1915: Vanceboro bridge bombing – the Saint Croix–Vanceboro Railway Bridge (over the U.S.–Canada border) was bombed by German saboteurs, although the bridge was not destroyed and was quickly rebuilt.
 1939: 1939 City of San Francisco derailment
 1942: Thamshavn Line sabotage – the transformer station for Norway's Thamshavn Line (an electric railroad) was blown up by Norwegian saboteurs during the German occupation.
 1951: Huntly rail bridge bombing – a rail bridge near Mahuta, three miles from Huntly, New Zealand, was severely damaged by dynamite charges during an industrial dispute. The sabotage was discovered after the bridge rocked noticeably as a slow moving morning passenger train came to rest across the bridge after braking for, and striking aside, warning sleepers laid across the track. Police believed it was an attempt to intimidate open-cast mine-workers who were not on strike.

 1995: Palo Verde derailment – a train in Palo Verde, Arizona, was derailed by saboteurs shifting the rails out of position, causing one fatality. The case remains unsolved.
 2002: Jaunpur train crash – a rail was broken and caused a train to derail, killing twelve people. An Islamic extremist organization was blamed.
 2002: Rafiganj train wreck – a train derailed on a bridge over a river in Bihar, India, killing at least 130 people. A Maoist terrorist organization was blamed.
 2022 rail war in Belarus

Damage to trains

Motivations

Vandalism
Greenock rail crash was caused by vandals.

Extortion
Klaus-Peter Sabotta sabotaged trains and attempted to extort money to prevent sabotaging more.

Terrorism

Both Isil and Al Qaeda have advocated for rail sabotage and have published detailed instructions for how to commit such acts.

Rafiganj train wreck

2001 Angola train attack

There have been 41 rail sabotage incidents in Washington state since 2021, thought to be ecotage.

Military
Operation Washing

.

In popular culture
The Wrecker (1929 film)
The Wrecker by Clive Cussler deals with

References

See also
Rail War
Railway sabotage during World War II
Stop the Wagons
Sherman's neckties
Railroad plough

 
Rail transport
Railway safety